Hilltop  is a suburb of Taupō in the Waikato region of New Zealand's North Island.

The suburb is close to Lake Taupō, Taupō Central and several schools. It includes high-value homes with lake views.

Part of the suburb suffered a major power surge in January 2018.

Demographics

Hilltop (Taupo District) had a population of 2,721 at the 2018 New Zealand census, an increase of 201 people (8.0%) since the 2013 census, and an increase of 168 people (6.6%) since the 2006 census. There were 1,017 households, comprising 1,302 males and 1,419 females, giving a sex ratio of 0.92 males per female. The median age was 42.2 years (compared with 37.4 years nationally), with 594 people (21.8%) aged under 15 years, 399 (14.7%) aged 15 to 29, 1,125 (41.3%) aged 30 to 64, and 603 (22.2%) aged 65 or older.

Ethnicities were 83.1% European/Pākehā, 23.7% Māori, 3.4% Pacific peoples, 3.9% Asian, and 2.0% other ethnicities. People may identify with more than one ethnicity.

The percentage of people born overseas was 17.8, compared with 27.1% nationally.

Although some people chose not to answer the census's question about religious affiliation, 50.6% had no religion, 37.0% were Christian, 2.6% had Māori religious beliefs, 0.7% were Hindu, 0.2% were Buddhist and 1.3% had other religions.

Of those at least 15 years old, 324 (15.2%) people had a bachelor's or higher degree, and 417 (19.6%) people had no formal qualifications. The median income was $29,600, compared with $31,800 nationally. 309 people (14.5%) earned over $70,000 compared to 17.2% nationally. The employment status of those at least 15 was that 978 (46.0%) people were employed full-time, 342 (16.1%) were part-time, and 48 (2.3%) were unemployed.

Education

The school opened in 1964.

The school opened in 1969.

Both these schools are co-educational. Rolls are as of

References

Suburbs of Taupō
Populated places in Waikato
Populated places on Lake Taupō